The 2008 Asian Taekwondo Championships are the 18th edition of the Asian Taekwondo Championships, and were held at The Sports Centre Gymnasium of Luoyang in Luoyang, China from April 26 to April 28, 2008.

Medal summary

Men

Women

Medal table

Team ranking

Men

Women

References
 www.wtf.org

Asian Championships
Asian Taekwondo Championships
Asian Taekwondo Championships
Taekwondo Championships